Eliprodil (codenamed SL-82.0715) is an NMDA antagonist drug candidate which selectively inhibits the NR2B (GLUN2B) subtype NMDA receptor at submicromolar concentrations. Eliprodil failed a Phase III clinical trial for the treatment of acute ischemic stroke in 1996, sponsored by Synthélabo Recherche.

NMDA receptors are a key component in mediating glutamate-induced excitotoxicity, and it is believed that NMDA antagonists would be neuroprotective after a stroke or other traumatic brain injury. After a traumatic brain injury, neurons become deprived of glucose and oxygen. These neurons quickly lose ATP and become depolarized, which releases glutamate. The extracellular buildup of glutamate triggers the overstimulation of AMPA and NMDA receptors. This, in turn, causes an influx of Na+ and Ca2+. Therefore, when NMDA receptors are activated, there is an increase in intracellular Ca2+ concentration. High Ca2+ causes fatal metabolic consequences, including neuronal cell death.

References 

Abandoned drugs
Chloroarenes
NMDA receptor antagonists
Fluoroarenes
Phenylethanolamines
Piperidines